Twickenham Methodist Church is a former Methodist church on Queens Road, Twickenham in the London Borough of Richmond upon Thames. It closed for worship in December 2016.

History

The foundation stone for the chapel was laid on 13 July 1880. The architect was Charles Bell (1846–99), who specialised in designing Wesleyan Methodist chapels. It replaced the previous Methodist chapel on Holly Road becoming, at the time, the only non-Anglican place of worship in Twickenham and was constructed by the building firm T and W Hickinbotham.

The chapel became the hall and Sunday school when a new church, the Christ Church, was added in 1899. The Christ Church building was demolished in 1986.

The church closed in December 2016.

References

Further reading
Fielding, William E: ''The Methodist Church, "Christ Church", Queens Road, Twickenham: Jubilee souvenir 1899–1949

1880 establishments in England
2016 disestablishments in England
Churches in Twickenham
Former churches in the London Borough of Richmond upon Thames
Methodist churches in the London Borough of Richmond upon Thames